James Arthur Taylor (18 June 1817 – 14 June 1889) was a British Conservative politician.

Taylor was the eldest son of James Taylor of Moseley Hall, Moseley, Worcestershire and Louisa née Skeye, daughter of Samuel Skeye of Spring Grove, Worcestershire. He was first educated at Winchester School, and was admitted as a pensioner and then matriculated at Trinity College, Cambridge in 1835 and 1836 respectively.

In 1843, he married Maria Theresa Rush, daughter of George Rush of Ellenham Hall, Northamptonshire. He was also a member of the Carlton Club and the Oxford and Cambridge Club.

References

External links
 

UK MPs 1841–1847
Conservative Party (UK) MPs for English constituencies
1817 births
1889 deaths
Alumni of Trinity College, Cambridge
People educated at Winchester College